Tecemotide (INN; emepepimut-S (USAN); formerly known as BLP25 or EMD 531444) is a synthetic lipopeptide that is used as antigen in an investigational therapeutic cancer vaccine (formerly known as Stimuvax, L-BLP25, BLP25 liposomal vaccine, or BLP25 liposome vaccine). The investigational therapeutic cancer vaccine is designed to induce a cellular immune response to cancer cells that express MUC1, a glycoprotein antigen that is widely over-expressed on common cancers such as lung cancer, breast cancer, prostate cancer, and colorectal cancer. The cellular immune response may lead to a rejection of tumor tissue expressing the MUC1 antigen.

Collaboration

Tecemotide was developed – until Clinical trial phase II – by the Canadian biotech company Biomira Inc., which changed its company name to Oncothyreon Inc. in 2007. Oncothyreon is now located in Seattle, Washington, and it changed its name to SGEN after a merger and acquisition in March 2018.

In 2001, Merck KGaA, of Darmstadt, Germany, entered into a collaboration and supply agreement with Biomira. In 2007, Merck KGaA acquired the exclusive worldwide marketing rights from Biomira, and Merck KGaA has since then been entirely responsible for the further clinical development of tecemotide. In 2008, Merck KGaA acquired the manufacturing rights for tecemotide from Oncothyreon. In 2011, Ono Pharmaceutical Company, of Japan, acquired a co-development and co-marketing license for tecemotide in Japan; Ono paid Merck KGaA 5 million euros.

Composition

Tecemotide is a synthetic lipopeptide that is 27 amino acids long. The first 25 amino acids of tecemotide are derived from the mucin 1 (MUC1, carcinoma-associated mucin, episialin, or CD227) sequence. The 26th modified amino acid, K, is palmityl-lysine (N6-(1-oxohexadecyl)-L-lysine), and the 27th is glycine.

Structure of the cancer vaccine

In the investigational therapeutic cancer vaccine (formerly known as Stimuvax, L-BLP25, BLP25 liposomal vaccine or BLP25 liposome vaccine), the antigen tecemotide is anchored — together with the adjuvant 3-O-deacyl-4′-monophosphoryl lipid A (MPL) — in the membrane of the liposome made from the lipids cholesterol, dimyristoyl phosphatidylglycerol (DMPG), and dipalmitoyl phosphatidylcholine. MPL is a derivative of the lipid A molecule found in the membrane of Gram-negative bacteria used as an adjuvant to initiate a non-specific immune stimulus, thereby stimulating the activation of antigen-presenting cells (APCs) through the toll-like receptor 4 (TLR-4) as well as macrophages. MPL is also used as an adjuvant in other vaccines, like Cervarix, a vaccine against certain types of cancer-causing human papillomavirus (HPV).

The precise mixture of lipids in the vaccine, as well as providing the structure of the liposome, is also formulated to enhance the uptake of the vaccine by the aforementioned antigen-presenting cells.

The cancer vaccine is a lyophilized powder, which is formulated to contain 300 μg of tecemotide and 150 μg of MPL per vial.

Clinical trials

Overview and results of all trials

Tecemotide clinical trials (as of September 2, 2014) sorted by (estimated) primary completion date:

Overview of completed trials

Overview of completed tecemotide trials (as of September 2, 2014) where results have been published, sorted by primary completion date:

Discontinued development

On August 18 and September 12, 2014, Oncothyreon and Merck KGaA, respectively, reported that a randomized Phase 1/2 study, EMR 63325–009, of tecemotide compared to a placebo in Japanese patients with Stage III non-small cell lung cancer did not meet its primary endpoint of an improvement in overall survival, and no treatment effect was seen in any of the secondary endpoints (progression-free survival, time to progression, or time to failure). Merck made the recommendation to stop the investigational treatment of patients in the EMR 63325-009 study in Japan.

Furthermore, Merck KGaA announced its decision to discontinue the Phase III START2 and INSPIRE studies, and all other Merck-sponsored clinical trials with tecemotide in NSCLC, worldwide. Merck will continue to supply tecemotide for ongoing investigator-sponsored trials in other indications in accordance with their agreements with the sponsors of these studies.

Drug development risks

Risks that could affect the further development of tecemotide published in the annual reports of Oncothyreon (grantor of the license) and Merck KGaA (license holder; responsible for clinical development, marketing and manufacturing) are listed in the following sections.

Efficacy

As published so far, primary end points have not been met in the clinical studies, and tecemotide has shown treatment effects only in statistical analyses of certain subgroups.

Patent situation

Oncothyreon's patent protection for tecemotide in the U.S. was scheduled to expire in 2018.

Human resources

In 2013, Merck KGaA reported problems with recruiting and retaining qualified employees: "Sourcing, recruiting and retaining specialists and talent at Merck are among the company's top priorities. Nevertheless, employee-related risks that affect business activities are likely, even though their impact is difficult to assess. Merck rates this as a medium risk."

Merck KGaA further reported with respect to its pharma division, Merck Serono: "Over 80% of the Merck Serono senior management positions [have been] replaced since 2011 [as of September 2014]."

Novel technologies

Tecemotide is based on novel technologies, which may raise new regulatory issues that could delay or complicate regulatory approval. Additionally, as of 2013, the FDA had approved for commercial sale in the United States only one active vaccine designed to stimulate an immune response against cancer. Consequently, there is limited precedent for the successful development or commercialization of products based on these technologies in this area.

Manufacture

Merck KGaA currently relies on third-party manufacturers to supply the product candidate: On Baxter International for the manufacture of tecemotide, and on GlaxoSmithKline plc (GSK) for the manufacture of the adjuvant in tecemotide, monophosphoryl lipid A (MPL). As of 2013, there was a risk that if tecemotide were not approved by 2015, GSK could terminate its obligation to supply MPL. In this case, Oncothyreon would have had to retain the necessary licenses from GSK required to have the adjuvant MPL manufactured, but the transfer of the process to a third party would delay the development and commercialization of tecemotide.

Competition

There are currently two products approved as maintenance therapy following treatment of inoperable locoregional Stage III NSCLC with induction chemotherapy: Tarceva (erlotinib), a targeted small molecule from Genentech, a member of the Roche Group, and Alimta (pemetrexed), a chemotherapeutic from Eli Lilly and Company. Tecemotide has not been tested in combination with or in comparison to these products. It is possible that other existing or new agents will be approved for this indication. In addition, there are at least two vaccines in development for the treatment of NSCLC, including GSK's MAGE A3 vaccine in Phase 3 and Transgene's TG-4010 in Phase 2/3. TG-4010 also targets MUC1, although using technology different from tecemotide.

Drug development cost

The costs spent on tecemotide development – beginning in the late 1990s – have not been published in detail by the companies Biomira/Oncothyreon, Merck KGaA, and Ono Pharmaceutical. Additionally, the estimation of the full cost of bringing a new drug to market – from discovery through clinical trials to approval – is complex and controversial.

However, a cautious estimate of the tecmotide development cost spent until 2014 ranges from 300 to 500 million euros (390 to 650 million US$; for more information see Drug development).

Timeline

References 

Cancer vaccines
Experimental cancer treatments
Merck brands